Caladenia iridescens, commonly known as bronze caps or bronze caladenia is a plant in the orchid family Orchidaceae and is endemic to Victoria. It is a ground orchid with a single leaf and one or two dusky red, purplish to greenish-brown flowers, often with golden tints and greenish to brownish on the back.

Description
Caladenia iridescens is a terrestrial, perennial, deciduous, herb with a spherical underground tuber. The flowers are dusky red, purplish to greenish-brown flowers, often with golden tints and greenish to brownish on the back. The sides of the labellum have blunt, dark red teeth, its tip is rolled under and there are four crowded rows of calli along its mid-line. Flowering occurs in October and November.

Taxonomy and naming
Caladenia iridescens  was first formally described in 1920 by Richard Rogers from a specimen collected at "Hall Gap" and the description was published in Transactions and Proceedings of the Royal Society of South Australia.

Distribution and habitat
Bronze caps occurs mainly in the Grampians where it grows in woodland and shrubby forest.

References 

iridescens
Plants described in 1920
Endemic orchids of Australia
Orchids of Victoria (Australia)